The Imperial tortoise beetle (Stolas imperialis) is a species of beetle found in Brazil.

References

Cassidinae
Articles containing video clips
Beetles described in 1898